Alison Drake may refer to:
 Alison Drake, pseudonym used by writer T. J. MacGregor
 Alison Drake (diver), English diver